Public transport in New Plymouth is undergoing a revival after many years of minimal council support since the early 1990s. The system covers New Plymouth city, as well as services to Waitara, Inglewood, Oakura and recently Stratford. Major changes were introduced on 31 May 2010. New routes were introduced, and service levels greatly expanded. Funding (from the Council and NZTA) for the expanded service was provided on a “trial” basis for two years and was subject to the services performing satisfactorily. These services became permanent in 2012.

System

Administration
Public transport in New Plymouth primarily consists of diesel buses operating over eleven regular routes during the week (plus a reduced weekend service) and regular school runs. Limited shopper services run south-east of the city to Inglewood and Stratford. New Plymouth has also historically operated both trolleybuses and trams. Despite having had stations at the breakwater, Elliot Street, Fitzroy, Egmont Road and Bell Block, suburban rail services have never operated in the city. 
Buses in the city are privately owned and subsidised, with the infrastructure (such as bus stops and shelters) owned by the New Plymouth District Council. Planning and subsidising public transport are in turn the responsibility of the Taranaki Regional Council. The district’s transport services are marketed under the name Citylink.

Types of vehicles used

Trams
New Plymouth’s electric tramway system (proposed as early as 1906 ) began operations on 10 March 1916 between Fitzroy and Weymouth Street (a short distance past the railway station). In the first week of operation, 18,213 passengers rode the trams.  Weymouth Street to the Breakwater opened on 21 April 1916 and Egmont Street to Morley Street followed on 20 May 1916.  Further extensions opened from Morley Street to David Street in Westown on 29 November 1923 and a final line to Pukekura Park and Gilbert street opened in July 1924. Further proposals were for extensions to Vogeltown and Frankleigh Park  but these were not successful.  New Plymouth Corporation Tramways was reputedly the smallest municipality in the world to operate trams on the overhead electricity system.

The line to Pukekura Park was the first to close, in 1937. The line to Westown closed in 1950 (replaced by electric trolleybuses) while the final service between the Port and Fitzroy route was replaced directly by diesel buses in 1954.

The original fleet consisted of 6 cars. No 1–4 were single-truck trams built in 1915 by Boon and Company of Christchurch. No 5–6 were larger double-bogie vehicles also from Boon & Co. No 7–9 were Birney Safety Cars introduced in 1921 (nicknamed “Tin Lizzies”) and were purchased for the Westown extension. Finally, No 10 was a double-bogie tram from Boon & Co. almost identical to No5 & 6.
All vehicles survived until the closure of the system on 23 July 1954. 

After the system was closed the tram bodies (stripped of electrical equipment and running gear) were auctioned off. One tram body still survives (Birney No 8) in unrestored condition in Whanganui.

Trolleybuses
In 1950 the Westown route was replaced with a fleet of 4 Crossley trolleybuses, of a design almost identical to Wellington's first trolleybuses. The route was extended along Tukapa Street from the end of the tram route at David Street to a new terminus at Wallath road. There was also a short run to Cutfield Road which was the closest point to Rugby Park where a turning circle could be located.

The service ran with little fuss for 17 years until October 1967, at which point they were replaced with diesel buses. Two vehicles survive. Trolleybus #1 in unrestored at the Kapiti Coast Electric Tramway while Trolleybus #3 is in fully working condition at Ferrymead in Christchurch.

Buses
New Plymouth City Council first started operating buses from 1918 (two years after starting its tram service). The council's preference when purchasing new vehicles was to tag its orders onto those of larger cities, resulting in a fleet of top specification. It could be described as being a microcosm of the fleets of Auckland, Wellington, Christchurch and Dunedin. Council continued operating these until the end of 1991 when the fleet was sold to Gold Star Buses, a Hamilton company that failed a few months later. Okato Bus Lines took over some of the Gold Star routes. In 2008 Tranzit took over from Okato Bus Lines and continues to run the buses. All bus have bike racks.

References

External links
Bus Timetable Information
1950s photos of trams

New Plymouth
New Plymouth
New Plymouth